Great Pretenders (Chinese: 千王) is a 1991 Hong Kong comedy film edited and directed by Ronny Yu and starring Raymond Wong, Tony Leung, Simon Yam and Amy Yip.

Plot
Taiwanese swindler Mr. Giant (Teddy Robin) loses in a poker match against Hong Kong swindler Wong Seung-chin (Raymond Wong) and they become sworn enemies. Meanwhile, Wong's apprentice Snake Wai (Tony Leung) meets Susan (Lok Wai), a widow who has recently returned to Hong Kong from Singapore. Planning to con a large sum of money from her, Wai sets up a plan with his acquaintances Yam Sai-sung (Simon Yam) and Yip Mei-mei (Amy Yip). However, Susan turns out to be swindler as well. Unable to salvage a fortune from Susan, Wai, Sung and Mei become indebted to her. In desperation, Wai seeks help from his mentor who wins back all the debts they owed Susan. Susan then becomes acquainted with Wong and his apprentices and they work together to swindle profiteer Lung Cho-tin (Leung Tin). They able to acquire HK$2 million form Lung very easily. Not wishing to be cheated, Lung hires Mr. Giant to battle against Wong.

Cast
Raymond Wong Pak-ming as Wong Seung-chin
Tony Leung Chiu-Wai as Snake Wai
Simon Yam as Yam Sai-sung
Amy Yip as Yip Mei-mei
Leung Tin as Lung Choi-tin
Teddy Robin as Mr. Giant
Lok Wai as Susan So
So Hiu-lam as Susan's fat brother
Lee Lung-kei as Cunning Kei
Cho Chai as Wing
Gabriel Wong as Beauty contest emcee
Ronny Yu as Beauty contest judge
Law Ching-ho as Victim of Wai's watch scam
Yeung Wan-king as Lost watch owner
Tsui Kwong-lam as Butcher playing mahjong
Chu Yat-hung as Housewife playing mahjong
Garry Chan as Drunk man outside hotel
Benz Kong as Card dealer
Joanna Chan as Monica
Chan Chi-hung as Superintendent Lee
Lau Leung-fat as Jewelry appraiser
Yip Wing-hung
Paul Cheung
Tony Chow
Lam Yim-fung
Liu Sou-bing
Woo Kwan-hung
James Ha as Tin's thug
Lai Sing-kwong as Tin's thug
Jameson Lai as Tan's thug
Chan Tat-kwong as Tan's thug
Christoper Chan as Tan's thug
Pinky Cheung as Li Li-li
Nicky Li as Drunk man hit by car
Ng Kwok-kin as Police officer
Hui Si-man as Rich widow
Lam Kwok-git

Theme song
The theme song of the film is Only Remembering the Old Deep Love (只記舊情重) composed by Joseph Koo with lyrics by Thomas Tang sung by Liza Wang.

Reception

Critical
Andrew Chan of the Film Critics Circle of Australia gave the film a score of 2/10 and wrote "The Great Pretenders is by no means a good movie. In fact, it is terrible and hard to finish…" Hong Kong Film Net  gave the film a score a 6/10 and wrote "The Great Pretenders certainly isn't an example of great cinema from Hong Kong, but it is good enough to set aside ninety minutes of your life for, especially if you're a fan of the actors involved."

Box office
The film grossed HK$4,333,406 at the Hong Kong box office during its theatrical run from 16 to 28 May 1991 in Hong Kong.

References

External links

Great Pretenders at Hong Kong Cinemagic

1991 films
1991 comedy films
Hong Kong slapstick comedy films
Films about gambling
1990s Cantonese-language films
Films directed by Ronny Yu
Films set in Hong Kong
Films shot in Hong Kong
1990s Hong Kong films